Magbeni is a village in the Port Loko District of Sierra Leone, and is a part of the Koya chiefdom within the district.  The village was part of Operation Barras, a rescue mission involving the British Army and the West Side Boys militia group who occupied the village.

Economy
Sand mining is the main industry in the village, which is mainly used for construction purposes.

References

Villages in Sierra Leone
Northern Province, Sierra Leone